KSEK-FM (99.1 FM) is a radio station broadcasting a  sports talk format. Licensed to Girard, Kansas, United States, it serves the Pittsburg area. The station is currently owned by American Media Investments, Inc.

Before June 24, 2013, the station broadcast a sports talk format. Before June 1, 2010, the station broadcast an active rock format.

KSEK is home to Pittsburg High School sports broadcasts.  They also are an affiliate of the syndicated Pink Floyd show "Floydian Slip."

On January 31, 2022, the station changed their format from classic rock to sports.

Previous logo

References

External links

SEK-FM
Radio stations established in 1977
Sports radio stations in the United States
Fox Sports Radio stations